The Cabinet of Jacques Laffitte was announced on 2 November 1830 by King Louis Philippe I.
It replaced the First ministry of Louis-Philippe. 
On 13 March 1831 it was replaced by the Cabinet of Casimir Périer.

Ministers

The ministers were:

Changes
On 17 November 1830:

On 27 December 1830:

References
Citations

Sources

French governments
1830 establishments in France
1831 disestablishments in France
Cabinets established in 1830
Cabinets disestablished in 1831